Alpine is a borough in Bergen County, New Jersey, United States, approximately  north of Midtown Manhattan. It is the easternmost community in New Jersey.

As of the 2020 United States census, the borough's population was 1,762, a decrease of 87 (−4.7%) from the 2010 census count of 1,849, which in turn reflected a decline of 334 (−15.3%) from the 2,183 counted in the 2000 census.

In 2012, Forbes ranked Alpine as America's most expensive ZIP Code with a median home price of $4.25 million. It was ranked 4th in the magazine's 2010 listing of "America's Most Expensive ZIP Codes", with a median home price of $3,814,885. In 2009, Forbes ranked Alpine first, along with Greenwich, Connecticut, with a median home price of $4.14 million. Alpine was tied with Greenwich for first in both 2006 and 2007 on the ABC News list of most expensive ZIP Codes, with a median home sale price of $3.4 million. In 2019, PropertyShark ranked Alpine as the 53rd most expensive ZIP Code in the country with a median sales price of $1,785,000, a drop from a ranking of 33rd nationwide in 2018 due to a decline of 19% in sales prices. Based on data from the 2006–2010 American Community Survey, the borough had a per-capita income of $107,604, ranked second in the state.

New Jersey Monthly magazine ranked Alpine as its 15th best place to live in its 2008 rankings of the "Best Places To Live" in New Jersey.

Alpine was formed by an act of the New Jersey Legislature on April 8, 1903, from portions of Harrington Township. The borough acquired a portion of Cresskill in 1904. The borough's name came from the wife of journalist Charles Nordhoff, who found the setting reminiscent of the Swiss Alps.

Geography

The borough has a total area of 9.22 square miles (23.89 km2), including 6.40 square miles (16.58 km2) of land and 2.82 square miles (7.31 km2) of water (30.61%).

The borough borders Closter, Cresskill, Demarest, Norwood, Rockleigh and Tenafly in Bergen County. Across the Hudson River, the borough borders The Bronx in New York City, and in Westchester County the city of Yonkers and the village of Hastings-on-Hudson (within the town of Greenburgh). North of the New York State border, the borough borders the hamlet of Tappan (in the town of Orangetown) in Rockland County.

Demographics

2010 census

 
The Census Bureau's 2006–2010 American Community Survey showed that (in 2010 inflation-adjusted dollars) median household income was $172,054 (with a margin of error of +/− $23,256) and the median family income was $192,188 (+/− $56,076). Males had a median income of $124,375 (+/− $28,708) versus $56,719 (+/− $21,358) for females. The per capita income for the borough was $107,604 (+/− $18,758). About 2.3% of families and 3.4% of the population were below the poverty line, including 4.6% of those under age 18 and 2.0% of those age 65 or over.

Same-sex couples headed four households in 2010, down from the eight counted in the 2000 Census.

2000 census
As of the 2000 United States census there were 2,183 people, 708 households, and 623 families residing in the borough. The population density was 343.5 people per square mile (132.5/km2). There were 730 housing units at an average density of 114.9 per square mile (44.3/km2). The racial makeup of the borough was 77.37% White, 1.51% African American, 0.23% Native American, 19.10% Asian, 0.05% Pacific Islander, 0.32% from other races, and 1.42% from two or more races. Hispanic or Latino of any race were 2.52% of the population.

There were 708 households, out of which 36.3% had children under the age of 18 living with them, 79.8% were married couples living together, 4.8% had a female householder with no husband present, and 12.0% were non-families. 9.9% of all households were made up of individuals, and 4.2% had someone living alone who was 65 years of age or older. The average household size was 3.08 and the average family size was 3.24.

In the borough the population was spread out, with 24.7% under the age of 18, 5.4% from 18 to 24, 20.9% from 25 to 44, 34.2% from 45 to 64, and 14.8% who were 65 years of age or older. The median age was 44 years. For every 100 females, there were 102.3 males. For every 100 females age 18 and over, there were 94.8 males.

The median income for a household in the borough was $130,740, and the median income for a family was $134,068. Males had a median income of $87,544 versus $45,536 for females. The per capita income for the borough was $76,995. 6.2% of the population and 5.4% of families were below the poverty line. Out of the total people living in poverty, 8.5% were under the age of 18 and 6.4% were 65 or older.

Government

Local government
Alpine is governed under the Borough form of New Jersey municipal government, which is used in 218 municipalities (of the 564) statewide, making it the most common form of government in New Jersey. The governing body is comprised of a Mayor and a Borough Council, with all positions elected at-large on a partisan basis as part of the November general election. A Mayor is elected directly by the voters to a four-year term of office. The Borough Council is comprised of six members elected to serve three-year terms on a staggered basis, with two seats coming up for election each year in a three-year cycle.

The Borough form of government used by Alpine is a "weak mayor / strong council" government in which council members act as the legislative body with the mayor presiding at meetings and voting only in the event of a tie. The mayor can veto ordinances subject to an override by a two-thirds majority vote of the council. The mayor makes committee and liaison assignments for council members, and most appointments are made by the mayor with the advice and consent of the council.

, the mayor of Alpine is Democrat Paul H. Tomasko, whose term of office ends December 31, 2026. Members of the Alpine Borough Council are Council President Gayle Gerstein (D, 2025), Scott Bosworth (D, 2025), Steven Cohen (D, 2024), Arthur I. Frankel (D, 2023), Vicki Frankel (D, 2024) and David Kupferschmid (D, 2023; elected to serve an unexpired term).

In August 2022, David Kupferschmid was appointed to fill the seat expiring in December 2023 that had been held by Laurence A. Shadek until he resigned from office the previous month.

In February 2021 the Borough Council appointed Scott Bosworth from a list of three candidates nominated by the Republican municipal committee to fill the council seat expiring in December 2022 that had been held by John Halbreich until he resigned from office earlier that month. Bosworth served on an interim basis until the November 2021 general election, when he was elected to serve the balance of the term of office.

Joan Ornstein was appointed by the Borough Council in February 2012 to fill the vacant seat of her husband Steve, who had died the previous month after being sworn in for a three-year term of office.

In 2018, the borough had an average property tax bill of $21,299, the highest in the county, compared to an average bill of $8,767 statewide.

Federal, state and county representation
Alpine is located in the 5th Congressional District and is part of New Jersey's 37th state legislative district. Prior to the 2011 reapportionment following the 2010 Census, Alpine had been in the 39th state legislative district.

Politics
As of March 2011, there were a total of 1,352 registered voters in Alpine, of which 341 (25.2% vs. 31.7% countywide) were registered as Democrats, 372 (27.5% vs. 21.1%) were registered as Republicans and 638 (47.2% vs. 47.1%) were registered as Unaffiliated. There was one voter registered to another party. Among the borough's 2010 Census population, 73.1% (vs. 57.1% in Bergen County) were registered to vote, including 94.5% of those ages 18 and over (vs. 73.7% countywide).

In the  2016 presidential election, Democrat Hillary Clinton received 458 votes (50.8% vs. 54.8% countywide), ahead of Republican Donald Trump with 419 votes (46.5% vs. 41.6% countywide) and other candidates with 25 votes (2.7% vs. 3.7% countywide), among the 902 ballots cast by the borough's 1,480 registered voters for a turnout of 60.9% (vs. 73% in Bergen County). In the 2012 presidential election, Republican Mitt Romney received 522 votes (59.0% vs. 43.5% countywide), ahead of Democrat Barack Obama with 342 votes (38.6% vs. 54.8%) and other candidates with 9 votes (1.0% vs. 0.9%), among the 885 ballots cast by the borough's 1,416 registered voters, for a turnout of 62.5% (vs. 70.4% in Bergen County).

In the 2008 presidential election, Republican John McCain received 532 votes (54.0% vs. 44.5% countywide), ahead of Democrat Barack Obama with 434 votes (44.1% vs. 53.9%) and other candidates with 8 votes (0.8% vs. 0.8%), among the 985 ballots cast by the borough's 1,378 registered voters, for a turnout of 71.5% (vs. 76.8% in Bergen County). In the 2004 presidential election, Republican George W. Bush received 588 votes (56.1% vs. 47.2% countywide), ahead of Democrat John Kerry with 451 votes (43.0% vs. 51.7%) and other candidates with 8 votes (0.8% vs. 0.7%), among the 1,048 ballots cast by the borough's 1,394 registered voters, for a turnout of 75.2% (vs. 76.9% in the whole county).

In the 2017 gubernatorial election, Republican Kim Guadagno received 53.0% of the vote (229 cast), ahead of Democrat Phil Murphy with 46.1% (199 votes), and other candidates with 0.9% (4 votes), among the 436 ballots cast by the borough's 1,416 registered voters (4 ballots were spoiled), for a turnout of 30.8%. In the 2013 gubernatorial election, Republican Chris Christie received 76.1% of the vote (348 cast), ahead of Democrat Barbara Buono with 23.2% (106 votes), and other candidates with 0.7% (3 votes), among the 465 ballots cast by the borough's 1,347 registered voters (8 ballots were spoiled), for a turnout of 34.5%.

In the 2009 gubernatorial election, Republican Chris Christie received 328 votes (54.8% vs. 45.8% countywide), ahead of Democrat Jon Corzine with 227 votes (37.9% vs. 48.0%), Independent Chris Daggett with 34 votes (5.7% vs. 4.7%) and other candidates with 3 votes (0.5% vs. 0.5%), among the 599 ballots cast by the borough's 1,347 registered voters, yielding a 44.5% turnout (vs. 50.0% in the county).

Education
The Alpine Public School District is a community school district serving students in kindergarten through eighth grade at Alpine School. As of the 2018–19 school year, the district, comprised of one school, had an enrollment of 138 students and 22.4 classroom teachers (on an FTE basis), for a student–teacher ratio of 6.2:1. In the 2016–17 school year, Alpine had the 33rd smallest enrollment of any school district in the state, with 160 students.

For ninth through twelfth grades, public school students attend Tenafly High School in Tenafly as part of a sending/receiving relationship with the Tenafly Public Schools under which the Alpine district paid tuition of $14,392 per student for the 2011–12 school year. As of the 2018–19 school year, the high school had an enrollment of 1,226 students and 103.9 classroom teachers (on an FTE basis), for a student–teacher ratio of 11.8:1.

Public school students from the borough and all of Bergen County are eligible to attend the secondary education programs offered by the Bergen County Technical Schools, which include the Bergen County Academies in Hackensack, and the Bergen Tech campus in Teterboro or Paramus. The district offers programs on a shared-time or full-time basis, with admission based on a selective application process and tuition covered by the student's home school district.

Transportation

Roads and highways

U.S. Route 9W, the Palisades Interstate Parkway and County Route 502 all pass through Alpine.

Public transportation
Rockland Coaches provides service along Route 9W to the Port Authority Bus Terminal in Midtown Manhattan on the 9T / 9AT routes and to the George Washington Bridge Bus Station on the 9 and 9A routes.

NJ Transit provides no bus or train service in Alpine.

NJ Transit bus route 753 provides service in Cresskill, which runs between Cresskill and Paramus at the Bergen Town Center.

Media

Alpine is home to the tower and laboratory built by Edwin Howard Armstrong after RCA evicted him from the Empire State Building. Armstrong's experimental FM station, W2XMN, used various frequencies to broadcast from the tower, first on 42.8 MHz; later on 44.1 MHz; and finally on 93.1 MHz in the modern FM band. The laboratory building and the tower still stand; the 400-foot (122-m) tower is home to many two-way radio users, one modern FM station (Fairleigh Dickinson University's WFDU), and backup transmitters for several of New York's television stations. The tower served as a primary tower for the stations after the September 11, 2001 terrorist attacks destroyed the World Trade Center.

There was some local opposition to this scheme, but the move was temporary, as the stations affected moved their primary broadcast facilities to the Empire State Building. The original lab building is home to a static display of historic communications equipment and offices; the USA Network cable channel operated from this building in the late 1970s.

Points of interest
Rio Vista is an upscale neighborhood in the southern section of Alpine. Rio Vista is home to Devil's Tower, a stone clock tower that is claimed to be haunted. It was originally designed by Charles Rollinson Lamb for sugar baron Manuel Rionda (1854–1943) in order to allow his wife to see New York from the New Jersey side of the Hudson River. The legend has it that when his wife saw him with another woman, she committed suicide by jumping off the tower.

After becoming upset over his wife's death, Rionda stopped all work on the tower. In reality Harriet Rionda died of natural causes in 1922 and was interred nearby for approximately 20 years. Her coffin was moved to Brookside Cemetery, Englewood. The estate was later sub-divided into 197 housing sites consisting of miles of roadway, infrastructure, and related facilities in the mid-1980s.

The New Jersey Section of the Palisades Interstate Park runs the length of Alpine along the top of the New Jersey Palisades and along the Hudson River. The Alpine Boat Basin serves as both a public picnic area and small marina for private boats. The area is a scenic riverfront picnic area and boat basin, plus beach for car-top boat launches (canoe and kayak), with fishing, access to hiking trails and Henry Hudson Drive, restrooms, water, vending machines, and public phones. Alpine Pavilion, an open-air stone picnic pavilion built in 1934 by the Civil Works Administration and available for rental is located here, as well as the historic Blackledge-Kearney House, said to be the site where Lord Cornwallis and his troops landed on November 20, 1776, in their pursuit of the Continental Army following the rout of George Washington's forces in the Battle of New York.

Notable people

People who were born in, residents of, or otherwise closely associated with Alpine include:

 Aras Agalarov (born 1955), Russian billionaire
 Gioia Marconi Braga, daughter of Guglielmo Marconi and chairwoman of the Marconi Foundation
 J. Cleaveland Cady (1837–1919), architect
 Sean Combs (born 1969), rap artist
 Kellyanne Conway (born 1967), strategist, and pollster who was campaign manager for Republican presidential candidate Donald Trump in 2016
 Johnny Damon (born 1973), outfielder who played for the New York Yankees from 2006 to 2009
 Damon Dash (born 1971), hip-hop entrepreneur
 Eddie Einhorn (1936–2016), part owner of the Chicago White Sox
 Patrick Ewing (born 1962), former center for the New York Knicks
 Fabolous (born 1977), rap artist
 Henry Clay Frick II (1919–2007), physician and head of the Frick Collection
 Andre Harrell (born 1960), founder of Uptown Records
 Matt Herr (born 1976), ice hockey forward who played for part of four NHL seasons
 O'Kelly Isley Jr. (1937–1986), founding member of The Isley Brothers
 Sachin H. Jain (born 1980), physician and Obama Administration official
 Jay-Z (born 1969), rap artist
 Ilya Kovalchuk (born 1983), former right wing for the NHL New Jersey Devils
 Lil' Kim (born 1975), rap artist, who rapped about her new hometown in her song Aunt Dot ("Come on Shanice, I'm takin' you to my house in Alpine...")
 Harold Lamb (1892–1962), historian, screenwriter, short story writer and novelist
 Eric Maskin (born 1950), co-winner of the 2007 Nobel Memorial Prize in Economic Sciences
 Pierre McGuire (born 1961), ice hockey analyst who was head coach of the Hartford Whalers
 Peter Moraites (1922–2014), Speaker of the New Jersey General Assembly who resigned from office in 1971 after facing charges that he accepted fees from a loan applicant
 Tracy Morgan (born 1968), comedian and actor
 Eddie Murphy (born 1961), comedian, actor who has appeared in the Beverly Hills Cop series and as the voice of Donkey in the Shrek series
 Charles Nordhoff (1830–1901), journalist
 Joe Piscopo (born 1951), actor, best known as a cast member of Saturday Night Live
 John Ringling (1866–1936), best-known of the seven Ringling brothers, five of whom merged the Barnum & Bailey Circus with their own Ringling Brothers Circus to create the Ringling Brothers Barnum and Bailey Circus, he built the Gray Crag estate in Alpine in the 1920s
 Manuel Rionda (1854–1943), Spanish-born, US-based sugar baron in Cuba
 Chris Rock (born 1965), comedian and actor, has described Alpine as "Beverly Hills with freaking snow" Rock has mentioned Alpine in his comedy act, pointing out the efforts and fame required of the black residents, while his next door neighbor, who is white, is "just a dentist".
 Larry Robbins (born 1971), founder of Glenview Capital Management
 Paul Rosenberg (born 1971), CEO of Goliath Records and former CEO of Def Jam Recordings, best known for his association with hip hop artist Eminem
 CC Sabathia (born 1980), pitcher for the New York Yankees
 Norman Sas (1925–2012), inventor of electric football and former member of the Alpine borough council
 Gary Sheffield (born 1968), former baseball player
 Russell Simmons (born 1957), hip-hop entrepreneur
 Wesley Snipes (born 1962), actor
 Britney Spears (born 1981), singer
 Seth Stephens-Davidowitz (born 1982), data scientist, economist and author
 Joseph A. Unanue (1925–2013), president of Goya Foods from 1976 to 2004
 Stevie Wonder (born 1950), musician
 Robert Zoellner (1932–2014), investor and stamp collector who was the second person to have assembled a complete collection of United States postage stamps

References

Sources

 Municipal Incorporations of the State of New Jersey (according to Counties) prepared by the Division of Local Government, Department of the Treasury (New Jersey); December 1, 1958.
 Clayton, W. Woodford; and Nelson, William. History of Bergen and Passaic Counties, New Jersey, with Biographical Sketches of Many of its Pioneers and Prominent Men. Philadelphia: Everts and Peck, 1882.
 Garbe-Morillo, Patricia. Closter and Alpine, Arcadia Publishing Images of America series, 2001. .
 Harvey, Cornelius Burnham (ed.), Genealogical History of Hudson and Bergen Counties, New Jersey. New York: New Jersey Genealogical Publishing Co., 1900.
 Van Valen, James M. History of Bergen County, New Jersey. New York: New Jersey Publishing and Engraving Co., 1900.
 Westervelt, Frances A. (Frances Augusta), 1858–1942, History of Bergen County, New Jersey, 1630–1923, Lewis Historical Publishing Company, 1923.

External links

 
 Alpine News

 
1903 establishments in New Jersey
Borough form of New Jersey government
Boroughs in Bergen County, New Jersey
Populated places established in 1903
New Jersey populated places on the Hudson River